Esteban Petignat (born 17 May 2000) is a Swiss professional footballer who plays as a midfielder for BSC Young Boys.

Club career
On 14 December 2022, Petignat's contract with Young Boys was terminated by mutual agreement.

External links
 SFL Profile
 SFV U20 profile

References

2000 births

Living people
Swiss men's footballers
Association football midfielders
BSC Young Boys players
Swiss Super League players
Swiss Promotion League players
Swiss 1. Liga (football) players